The Yes Album Tour was a concert tour by progressive rock band Yes.  Though it began more than six months before its release, the tour was named after the band's third studio album.  Lasting from 17 July 1970 until 31 July 1971, and including 170 performances, the tour began at the Lyceum in London—Steve Howe's first performance with the band—and ended at the Crystal Palace Bowl, also in London—Tony Kaye's last performance with the band before his 13-year absence.

History 
The tour saw the band play concerts in the United Kingdom, Belgium, Germany, Switzerland, the Netherlands, Denmark, Sweden, France, Italy, Canada, and the United States over three legs—a European leg, a North American leg and a single-show return to the United Kingdom. Many of the American shows were shared with Iron Butterfly. Phil Carson, then-European General Manager of Atlantic Records, decided that as Iron Butterfly could attract enough of an audience to fill the venues on their tour, it would be good exposure for Yes as he was trying to break them into the American market at the time.

Live releases 
Live material from this tour has appeared on the following releases:

 Steve Howe's performance of "Clap" at the London Lyceum on 17 July 1970 was recorded and included on The Yes Album as the second track.

Tour band 
The line-up for the tour unchanged throughout its duration, and was the fifth incarnation of Yes. Steve Howe joined the band two months previously: all concerts during May and June were cancelled while the band found a replacement for original guitarist Peter Banks, and Tony Kaye was replaced by Rick Wakeman shortly after the tour ended in time for rehearsal sessions for Fragile. 

 Jon Anderson — vocals, harmonium, Dewtron Mister Bassman Bass Pedals
 Steve Howe — Gibson ES-175, Martin 00-18 acoustic guitar, vachalia, vocals
 Chris Squire — Rickenbacker 4001S, Fender Telecaster bass, vocals
 Tony Kaye — Hammond organ
 Bill Bruford — Ludwig drums, Paiste and Zildjian cymbals

Typical setlist 
On the 1970 shows, the set list consisted of:

 "Astral Traveller" (Anderson)
 "I've Seen All Good People" (Anderson, Squire)
 "Clap" (Including an excerpt of "Classical Gas") (Howe)
 "Yours Is No Disgrace" (Anderson, Squire, Steve Howe, Tony Kaye, Bill Bruford)
 "A Bass Odyssey" (Howe, Squire)
 "America" (Paul Simon) (originally by Simon & Garfunkel) 
The 1971 shows had a typical setlist of:
 "Yours Is No Disgrace" (Anderson, Squire, Steve Howe, Tony Kaye, Bill Bruford)
 "I've Seen All Good People" (Anderson, Squire)
 "Clap" (Including an excerpt of "Classical Gas") (Howe)
 "Perpetual Change" (Anderson, Squire)
 "Everydays" (Stephen Stills)
 "America" (Paul Simon) (originally by Simon & Garfunkel) (Replaced by "It's Love" from 24 June 1971 on)

Other songs played:
 "Then" (Anderson) (23, 29, 30 January 1971)
 "Mood For A Day" (Howe) (5, 15, 16, 17, 18, 19, 20 July 1971)

Tour dates 
On various dates of the tour, Yes were supported by Black Sabbath, Uriah Heep, Supertramp, Deep Purple, Wishbone Ash, The Strawbs, Iron Butterfly, Queen, and Jethro Tull.  At other performances, such as festivals, the band shared the bill with Pink Floyd and Elton John.

Beginning with the 1971 dates (when Yes began to be supported by Iron Butterfly), ticket prices were set at 10s—approximately £10 ($16 USD) in 2012.

 Cancelled shows 

The February 1971 shows in Paris were cancelled due to rioting.  After leaving France, the band had to cancel some UK shows after their van was involved in a road collision.

Reception 
Writing in Melody Maker in review of the group's shows on 31 October 1970 at the Queen Elizabeth Hall, Chris Welch described Howe as "stealing the show", Bruford as a "proverbial tower of strength", and Anderson as "simple but emotive".

Footnotes

References 

1970 concert tours
1971 concert tours
Yes (band) concert tours